Punahele Michael Soriano (born November 22, 1992) is an American mixed martial artist who competes in the Middleweight division of the Ultimate Fighting Championship.

Background
As a senior at Kahuku High School in Laie, Hawaii, on the North Shore of Oahu, Soriano was the 171-pound state champion, after placing third in the state as a junior. In addition to being a high school state champion in wrestling, he was a high school state judo champion. He went on to wrestle Division-III at Wartburg College in Iowa, where he earned All-America honors at the 2014 NCAAs by placing seventh in the 197-pound bracket, in the process becoming the first qualifier from Hawaii.

Soriano's interest in MMA started through friend and current UFC fighter Dan Ige, who invited Soriano to help train MMA fighters in wrestling.

Mixed martial arts career

Early career
After making his professional debut in Hawaii on January 28, 2017, at X-1 World Events 45, and getting a first-round submission win, Soriano made his Middleweight and mainland debut on July 29, 2017, at PFL Everett against Jon Gover. He won the bout via first-round TKO.

Soriano faced Rafael Celestino on April 6, 2019, at Titan FC 49. He won the bout via knockout in under a minute.

After picking up a TKO win in just 45 seconds at V3 Fights 69 against James Horne, Soriano faced Jhonoven Pati on October 19, 2018, at LFA 52. He won the bout via a first-round rear-naked choke.

Soriano was invited onto Dana White's Contender Series 17 on June 18, 2019, where he faced Jamie Pickett. He won the bout via unanimous decision, getting a UFC contract in the process and going past the first round for the first time in his MMA career.

Ultimate Fighting Championship
Soriano made his UFC debut against Oskar Piechota on December 14, 2019, at UFC 245. He won the fight via knockout in the first round.

Soriano faced fellow undefeated DWCS alumni Duško Todorović on January 16, 2021, at UFC on ABC: Holloway vs. Kattar. He won the bout, getting the TKO at the end of the first round.

Soriano was scheduled to face Anthony Hernandez on June 26, 2021, at UFC Fight Night: Gane vs. Volkov. The pairing was previously scheduled to take place in May 2020 at UFC on ESPN: Overeem vs. Harris, but Soriano pulled out due to undisclosed reasons. In turn, Hernandez pulled out in late May due to a hand injury and was replaced by Brendan Allen, with the new matchup taking place a month later at UFC on ESPN: Sandhagen vs. Dillashaw. Soriano lost the fight via unanimous decision.

Soriano faced Nick Maximov on February 5, 2022 at UFC Fight Night 200. He lost the fight via split decision. 12 out of 16 media scores gave it to Maximov.

Soriano faced Dalcha Lungiambula on July 16, 2022 at UFC on ABC 3. He won the fight via knockout in the second round. This win earned Soriano his first Performance of the Night bonus award.

Soriano faced Roman Kopylov on January 14, 2022 at  UFC Fight Night 217. He lost the fight via technical knockout in the second round.

Championships and accomplishments
Ultimate Fighting Championship
 Performance of the Night (One time)

Mixed martial arts record

|- 
|Loss
|align=center|9–3
|Roman Kopylov
|TKO (body kick and punches)
|UFC Fight Night: Strickland vs. Imavov
|
|align=center|2
|align=center|3:19
|Las Vegas, Nevada, United States
|
|-
|Win
|align=center|9–2
|Dalcha Lungiambula
|KO (punches)
|UFC on ABC: Ortega vs. Rodríguez
|
|align=center|2
|align=center|0:28
|Elmont, New York, United States
|
|-
|Loss
| align=center|8–2
|Nick Maximov
|Decision (split)
|UFC Fight Night: Hermansson vs. Strickland
| 
|align=center|3
|align=center|5:00
|Las Vegas, Nevada, United States
|
|-
|Loss
| align=center|8–1
|Brendan Allen
| Decision (unanimous)
|UFC on ESPN: Sandhagen vs. Dillashaw
|
|align=center|3
|align=center|5:00
|Las Vegas, Nevada, United States
|
|-
| Win
| align=center| 8–0
| Duško Todorović
| TKO (punches)
| UFC on ABC: Holloway vs. Kattar
| 
| align=center| 1
| align=center| 4:48
| Abu Dhabi, United Arab Emirates
| 
|-
| Win
| align=center| 7–0
| Oskar Piechota
|KO (punch)
|UFC 245 
|
|align=center|1
|align=center|3:17
|Las Vegas, Nevada, United States
|
|-
| Win
| align=center| 6–0
|Jamie Pickett
|Decision (unanimous)
| Dana White's Contender Series 17
| 
| align=center| 3
| align=center| 5:00
| Las Vegas, Nevada, United States
|
|-
| Win
| align=center| 5–0
|Jhonoven Pati
| Submission (rear-naked choke)
| Legacy Fighting Alliance 52
| 
| align=center| 1
| align=center| 3:36
| Belton, Texas, United States
| 
|-
| Win
| align=center| 4–0
| James Horne
| TKO (punches)
|V3 Fights 69
|
|align=center|1
|align=center|0:45
|Memphis, Tennessee, United States
|
|-
| Win
| align=center|3–0
| Rafael Celestino
|KO (punches)
|Titan FC 49
|
| align=center|1
| align=center|0:31
|Fort Lauderdale, Florida, United States
|
|-
| Win
| align=center| 2–0
| Jon Gover
| TKO (punches)
|PFL Everett
|
| align=center|1
| align=center|2:36
|Everett, Washington, United States
|
|-
| Win
| align=center|1–0
| Jon Ferrell
| Submission (rear-naked choke)
|X-1 World Events 45
|
|align=center|1
|align=center|2:20
|Honolulu, Hawaii, United States
|

See also 
List of current UFC fighters
 List of male mixed martial artists

References

External links
  
 

1992 births
Living people
American male judoka
American male mixed martial artists
American male sport wrestlers
Middleweight mixed martial artists
Mixed martial artists utilizing collegiate wrestling
Mixed martial artists utilizing judo
Ultimate Fighting Championship male fighters
People from Kauai County, Hawaii
Mixed martial artists from Hawaii
Wartburg Knights wrestlers